Love Letters is the debut album from American country music artist Leslie Satcher. It was released in 2000 on Warner Bros. Records. Although it produced four singles, none of them charted. Satcher wrote or co-wrote eleven of its twelve tracks, with the only outside contribution being her cover of Bobbie Gentry's "Ode to Billie Joe".

Reception
Billboard magazine said with the album, "intelligent lyrics meet powerhouse vocals and passionate performance" calling the combination "lethal".  Chuck Taylor agreed, calling Love Letters "an impressive collection of well-crafted songs". Texas Monthly remarked that "though Satcher is occasionally guilty of trite lyrics or oversinging, her career is off to a promising start."  Taking into account Satcher's songwriter background, People magazine called the album "a welcome entrance from behind the scenes" but "bad news for Nashville's other singers, since Satcher...may be tempted to keep her best work for herself from now on."

Track listing

Personnel
David Angell- violin
Larry Beaird- acoustic guitar
Dennis Burnside- string arrangements 
J.T. Corenflos- electric baritone guitar, electric guitar
David Davidson- violin
Glen Duncan- fiddle
Connie Ellisor- violin
Sonny Garrish- steel guitar
Carl Gorodetzky- string contractor
Kevin "Swine" Grantt- bass guitar
Mickey Grimm- percussion
Owen Hale- drums
Randy Hardison- drums
Emmylou Harris- background vocals on "Love Letters From Old Mexico"
Wes Hightower- background vocals
Steve Hinson- dobro
Alison Krauss- background vocals on "Love Letters From Old Mexico" and "Look Who's Talking Now"
Lee Larrison- violin
Paul Leim- drums
B. James Lowry- acoustic guitar
Bob Mason- cello
Cate Myer- violin
Mickey Raphael- harmonica
Michael Rhodes- bass guitar
Jerry Salley- background vocals
Leslie Satcher- lead vocals
Steve Sheehan- acoustic guitar
Pam Sixfin- violin
Catherine Styron- piano
Alan Umstead- violin
Catherine Umstead- violin
Gary Van Osdale- viola, violin
Biff Watson- acoustic guitar
Kris Wilkinson- violin
Lonnie Wilson- drums
Jeannie L. Winn- background vocals
Glenn Worf- bass guitar
Paul Worley- acoustic guitar

References

2000 debut albums
Leslie Satcher albums
Warner Records albums